Marquis Xiaozi of Jin, ancestral name Ji (姬), given name unknown, was the sixteenth ruler of the state of Jin. He was also the sixth ruler of Jin in the Spring and Autumn period. He reigned for four years.

In 705 BC, the fourth year of the reign of Marquis Xiaozi of Jin, Duke Wu of Quwo killed Marquis Xiaozi. King Huan of Zhou sent Guo Zhong (虢仲) to attack Duke Wu, and Duke Wu retreated to Quwo.  King Huan of Zhou then installed Min, the uncle of Marquis Xiaozi, on the throne of Jin.

Monarchs of Jin (Chinese state)
8th-century BC Chinese monarchs
705 BC deaths
8th-century BC murdered monarchs
Assassinated Chinese politicians
Year of birth unknown